The Fayette County Housing Authority oversees federal and state housing facilities, as well as Section 8 rentals in Fayette County, Pennsylvania. FCHA oversees  1,323 public housing units as well as 1,104 Section 8 rentals.

Public housing facilities
Of the 1,323 public housing rentals, FCHA has them spread into nineteen federally overseen sites as well as four state-managed sites.

Federal sites

State-managed sites
 Little Wood Acres
 Luzerne Terrace
 Oliver Heights
 Washington Mill

See also
 List of municipal authorities in Fayette County, Pennsylvania
 Housing and Urban Development
 List of public housing authorities in Pennsylvania

References

Public housing in Pennsylvania